Lori Watson is a fiddle player and folk singer who performs traditional and contemporary folk music. She is the first doctor of Artistic Research in Scottish Music.

Biography
Watson grew up in the Scottish Borders where she was a founder member of The Small Hall Band and played in the Clarty Cloot Ceilidh Band. She studied Scottish music at the Royal Scottish Academy of Music and Drama in Glasgow and graduated in 2003. She completed a PhD in Contemporary Innovation and Traditional Music in Scotland. She performs traditional, contemporary and original folk music and sings in Scots and English.

Watson is from a musical Scots/Irish family. Her great grandfather Peter Augustus Meechan was a popular fiddle player in Glasgow, her grandfather Alexander Watson played accordion and everyone in the family sang. Today, her father sings and plays guitar, bouzouki and mandolin, and her mother sings and plays bodhran. Their small, independent record label, ISLE Music Scotland, owned and run by the family, issued the Borders Young Fiddles CD, a landmark in Scottish / Borders fiddle music, and Watson's debut in 2006, :Three. Watson's brother Innes Watson, graduated from the RSAMD in 2006 and is building a career as a full-time musician.

Awards
 Borders Young Musician Award 1999
 BBC Radio Scotland Young Traditional Musician 2002 finalist
 BBC Radio Scotland Young Traditional Musician 2003 finalist
 Celtic Connections Danny Kyle Award 2005
 Eiserner Eversteiner nominee 2007
 Burnsong Winner 2007
 MG ALBA Scots Trad Music Awards Scots Singer of the Year 2016

Bands
 Lori Watson and Rule of Three
 Lori Watson – vocals and fiddle
 Innes Watson – guitars, harmony vocals
 John Somerville – piano accordion
 Donald Hay – percussion
 Duncan Lyall – double bass
Boreas
 Lori Watson – vocals (Scots) and fiddles
 Britt Pernille Frøholm – hardanger and fiddles
 Rachel Newton – harp and vocals (Gaelic)
 Irene Tillung – chromatic accordion
Watson/Black
 Lori Watson – fiddles and vocals (Scots/English)
 Fiona Black – accordion
Fireside Music Company
 Lori Watson – fiddle, song, scripted speech
 Margaret Bennett – storytelling and song
Border Fiddles
 Lori Watson – fiddle
 Shona Mooney – fiddle
 Innes Watson – fiddle
 Rachel Cross – fiddle
 Carly Blain – fiddle
 Sandy Watson – guitar and bouzouki

Discography
 Borders Young Fiddles, by Borders Young Fiddles, Borders Traditional Series Vol. 3, ISLE Music Scotland, 2004
 :Three, by Lori Watson with Fiona Young, Innes Watson & Barry (Spad) Reid, ISLE Music Scotland, 2006
 No.1 Scottish, Traditional Music from the RSAMD, RSAMD, 2002, Greentrax, 2007
 Pleasure's Coin, by Lori Watson and Rule of Three, ISLE Music Scotland, 2009
 Borders Tunesmiths, by Borders Tunesmiths, Borders Traditions Series Vol. 6, 2009
 The Songs of Sandy Wright, by Various, Navigator Records, 2010
 The Rough Guide To Scottish Music, by Various, The Rough Guide, 2010

Projects

Contemporary innovation and traditional music in Scotland 
Lori Watson completed doctoral studies at the RCS in Glasgow and St Andrews University in 2013. She investigated innovation and beyond-tune composition by traditional musicians in Scotland including a substantial folio of new and experimental musical works. Her supervisors were Dr. Stephen Broad, Dr. Liz Doherty, Dr. Stuart Eydmann and Prof. Raymond MacDonald.

James Hogg, a Life in Music
This concert featuring the work and life of James Hogg in music, song, poetry and monologue was co-written with Innes Watson and John Nicol, and was performed and recorded live at Both Sides of the Tweed music festival in Selkirk, 2005.

MAELSTRØM - Legends of the Underworld
Watson wrote the music for this devised theatrical production at the Aberdeen International Arts Festival in 2016. The project was produced by Youth Music Theatre UK. Blending Scottish and Norwegian musical influences following the journey of 'Hag' to the heart of the Corryvreckan maelstrom, a powerful place where the essences of Scotland and Norway meet.

Teaching
Watson was a lecturer and examiner at the Royal Conservatoire of Scotland (RCS) including Contemporary Studies, Honours Projects, Scots Song and Principal Study Song Group. She leads the Tolbooth Traditional Music Project for young people and teaches workshops at folk festivals like the now-defunct Border Gaitherin and the Scots Fiddle Festival. She was a Senior Tutor at Glasgow Fiddle Workshop for 10 years and taught fiddle on the Folk and Traditional Music degree at Newcastle University for six years. She is currently a lecturer in Scottish Ethnology at the University of Edinburgh.

Articles
 Broad, Stephen (2006). 'Practice-based Research at the Royal Scottish Academy of Music and Drama' in Konstnarlig forskning: Artiklar, Prjektrapporter & Reportage ed. Torbjorn Lind (Stockholm: Swedish Research Council, 2005), pp. 17–25.

References

External links
 
 Rule Of Three
 Boreas
 Watson/Black
 Fireside Music Company
 ISLE Music Scotland
 Border Fiddles

Living people
Scottish fiddlers
Scottish folk singers
1981 births
Alumni of the University of St Andrews
21st-century Scottish singers
21st-century violinists